"Oh Sherrie" is the debut solo single by American singer Steve Perry. Written by Perry, Randy Goodrum, Craig Krampf and Bill Cuomo, the song was recorded and released on Perry's first solo album Street Talk in 1984, which he released while still a member of Journey. The song is often regarded as an "honorary" Journey song, being credited to the band on several hit compilation albums and in other media, largely due to its resemblance to the band's trademark sound, as well as their performances of the song on the Raised on Radio Tour, which proved to be Perry's live swansong with the band. The song is written in F major.

The song was Perry's biggest hit as a solo artist and written for his then-girlfriend Sherrie Swafford, who also appeared in the music video. The song hit number three on the pop chart and number one on the rock chart in the United States, partly aided in its success by a music video released to promote the song, which received heavy airplay on MTV.

Two of the song's co-writers and supporting musicians, Bill Cuomo and Craig Krampf, earlier performed on Kim Carnes' signature song "Bette Davis Eyes" in 1981.  Cuomo, who performed the keyboard riff on "Oh Sherrie," was the musician responsible for the keyboard riff on "Bette Davis Eyes", and Krampf was the drummer on "Bette Davis Eyes" while Larrie Londin was the drummer for "Oh Sherrie". Cuomo, Krampf and Perry had started composing the song at approximately midnight with little more than the simple chorus of "Oh Sherrie" and "Hold on, hold on" plus a few simple sounds. Swafford had been in the room with them initially, but had gone to sleep because of the late hour.

Music video
The video was shot at the historic entertainment venue the Park Plaza Hotel - now called the MacArthur, located at 607 South Park View St. in Los Angeles, CA.

The video opens with what appears to be an elaborate formal Royal Wedding, complete with a bride in a large wedding dress, various Royal Court members, trumpet players, minister, and a man wearing a royal robe and a crown. As the bride approaches the altar and groom, she kneels, he takes off his crown revealing he is Steve Perry. He complains he cannot perform this scene. The director yells "cut!" and the camera pulls back to reveal this was an elaborate movie set. The scene is restarted, and again Perry announces he cannot do the scene, claiming it is too pretentious. Stripping off his crown and costume, ignoring various people who want his attention,  Perry walks over to a quiet corner. He begins singing a cappella, the first lines of the song
Well you should have been gone!
Knowing how I made you feel.
He continues two more lines, then the music starts. As he sings, below at a large entrance similar to a church or a train station, his girlfriend Sherrie walks in wearing a white skirt. He continues singing, then runs downstairs to sing to her, as she smiles and laughs. He then embraces her as the song ends. As the director calls out to Perry, imploring him to resume the video, Perry escorts Sherrie out as they exit, with his arm around her.

Chart history

Weekly charts

Year-end charts

See also
List of RPM number-one singles of 1984
List of number-one mainstream rock hits (United States)

References

1984 debut singles
1984 songs
Steve Perry (musician) songs
Songs written by Steve Perry
Songs written by Randy Goodrum
RPM Top Singles number-one singles
Columbia Records singles